"I'm Only in It for the Love" is a song written by Kix Brooks, Deborah Allen and Rafe Van Hoy, and recorded by American country music artist John Conlee.  It was released in June 1983 as the first single from the album In My Eyes.  The song was Conlee's fourth number one on the country chart.  The single went to number one for one week and spent a total of twelve weeks on the country chart.

Charts

Weekly charts

Year-end charts

References

1983 singles
1983 songs
John Conlee songs
Songs written by Kix Brooks
Songs written by Deborah Allen
MCA Records singles
Songs written by Rafe Van Hoy